Nelson Catalina (born December 9, 1950) is an American college basketball coach. He was the head coach at Arkansas State University from 1984 to 1995.

References

1950 births
Living people
American men's basketball coaches
Arkansas State Red Wolves men's basketball coaches